Magazine is the name for an item or place within which ammunition or other explosive material is stored. It is taken originally from the Arabic word "makhāzin" (مخازن), meaning 'storehouses', via Italian and Middle French.

The term is also used for a place where large quantities of ammunition are stored for later distribution, or an ammunition dump.  This usage is less common.

Field magazines

In the early history of tube artillery drawn by horses (and later by mechanized vehicles), ammunition was carried in separate unarmored wagons or vehicles.  These soft-skinned vehicles were extremely vulnerable to enemy fire and to explosions caused by a weapons malfunction.

Therefore, as part of setting up an artillery battery, a designated place would be used to shelter the ready ammunition.  In the case of batteries of towed artillery the temporary magazine would be placed, if possible, in a pit, or natural declivity, or surrounded by sandbags or earthworks.  Circumstances might require the establishment of multiple field magazines so that one lucky hit or accident would not disable the entire battery.

Naval magazines 

The ammunition storage area aboard a warship is referred to as a magazine or the "ship's magazine" by sailors.

Historically, when artillery was fired with gunpowder, a warship's magazines were built below the water line—especially since the magazines could then be readily flooded in case of fire or other dangerous emergencies on board the ship. An open flame was never allowed inside the magazine.

More modern warships use semi-automated or automated ammunition hoists. The path through which the naval artillery's ammunition passed typically has blast-resistant airlocks and other safety devices, including provisions to flood the compartment with seawater in an emergency.

The separation of shell and propellant gave the storage of the former the name "shell room" and the latter "powder room".

Surface warships that have carried torpedoes, and ones that still do (such as the Mark 46 torpedo for antisubmarine warfare), have had torpedo magazines for carrying these dangerous antiship and antisubmarine weapons in well-defended compartments.

With the advent of missile-equipped warships, the term missile "magazine" has also been applied to the storage area for guided missiles on the ship, usually carried below the main decks of the warships. For ships with both forward and aft surface-to-air missile launchers, there are at least two missile magazines. Sometimes the magazines of guided-missile frigates and guided-missile destroyers have carried or do carry a mixture of various types of missiles: surface-to-air missiles, antisubmarine missiles such as the ASROC missile, and antiship missiles such as the Harpoon missile. See especially the s, owned by several different navies around the world, in which one 40-missile magazine carries a mixture of all three types of missiles: surface-to-air, surface-to-surface, and surface-to-underwater.

In aircraft carriers, the magazines are required to store not only the aircraft carrier's own defensive weapons, but all of the weapons for her warplanes, including rapid-fire gun ammunition, air-to-air missiles such as the Sidewinder missile, air-to-surface missiles such as the Maverick missile, Mk 46 ASW torpedoes, Joint Direct Attack Munitions, "dumb bombs", HARM missiles, and antiship missiles such as the Harpoon missile and the Exocet missile.

Detonation threat 

Naval magazines face considerable risk of detonation, especially in cases of attack, accident, or fire. Such detonations have sunk many warships and caused many other incidents.

Battleships were highly armored to protect from external attack, but the strength of the construction aids to constrict and worsen the impact of internal explosions, as the rigid steel does not allow blast waves to dissipate. The USS Iowa turret explosion was such an example: in 1989 a loading incident caused a gun turret explosion, which spread to further powder stores in the turret, which eventually killed all 47 men in the turret. The turret served to contain the blast, protecting the rest of the ship, but amplified the blast inside the turret ensuring deadly conditions.

During World War II, many ships met their end via magazine detonations. The magazines of the Japanese battleship Yamato exploded in 1945 after hours of continuous assault by Allied aircraft, utterly destroying the ship and leaving few survivors.

See also
Ammunition dump
Armory
Arsenal
Gunpowder magazine
Gunroom

References

External links

Colonial Williamsburg Magazine

 
Ammunition dumps
Artillery ammunition
Fortifications by type